Nudium or Noudion was one of the six cities (along with Lepreum, Phrixae, Pyrgus, Epium, and Macistus) founded by the Minyans in the territory of the  and Caucones, in Triphylia in ancient Elis, but which was destroyed by the Eleians in the time of Herodotus.

It is unlocated.

References

Populated places in ancient Elis
Former populated places in Greece
Triphylia
Lost ancient cities and towns